Cairnbaine, also called Tiredigan Court Tomb, is a court cairn and National Monument located in County Monaghan, Ireland.

Location

History

Court cairns are the oldest kind of megalithic monument in Ireland, being built from 4000 BC onward.

Description

Cairnbaine is a dual court tomb. The gallery is exposed and one roof slab is in place. In front of the gallery are court stones and the remains of a façade.

References

National Monuments in County Monaghan
Archaeological sites in County Monaghan
Tombs in the Republic of Ireland